Siyabulela Nelani (born 24 January 1979) is a South African cricketer. He played in five first-class matches for Border in 2001/02 and 2002/03.

See also
 List of Border representative cricketers

References

External links
 

1979 births
Living people
South African cricketers
Border cricketers
Cricketers from East London, Eastern Cape